Charbel Rouhana is a Lebanese oud player. Born in 1965 in Amsheet, a town north of Beirut, Charbel pursued his music education at the Université Saint-Esprit de Kaslik, obtaining his diploma in oud instrumentation in 1986 and his M.A. in Musicology in 1987.

Discography

Studio albums
 1997: Salamat
 1998: Mada (with Hani Siblini)
 2000: Mazaj Alani
 2003: The Art of Middle Eastern Oud (out in Lebanon under the title Vice Versa)
 2004: Sourat
 2006: Dangerous
 2008: Handmade
 2010: Doux Zen Oud Duet with Ellie Khoury
 2014: Tashweesh

DVDs
 2008: Charbel Rouhana & the Beirut Oriental Ensemble: The "Handmade" Concert

Awards
 Winner of the First Prize at the 1990 Hirayama, Japan competition for the composition “Hymn of Peace”.

Concerts and participations
 2010: Workshop+ playing at the first Egyptian Oud Forum
 2009: Damascus Castle concert, Syria
 2009: UNESCO ball, during the Celebration of Francophonie in Beirut.
 2008: Roman amphitheater Concert, Jabla, Syria.
 2003: Oud Forum, Jarash Festival, Damascus
 2003: Workshop+ solo Playing at the Cairo Opera House
 2003: An evening organized by the Lebanese Club, Prague, Czech Republic
 2002: Oud Forum, Thessaloniki, Greece.
 2002: Participation in the opening ceremony of the ninth Francophone Summit in Beirut.
 2002: Lebanese week, Cahors, France.
 2002: A music concert, Weimar, Germany.
 2002: Music Without Borders, Dubai
 2002: Composing music for the opening ceremony of the Dubai Shopping Festival
 2001: Tenth Festival of faces of la Francophonie, Paris, France
 2001: Souk Okaz, Jordan
 2000: Oud Festival II, Tetouan, Morocco.
 1999: Festival Belfort, France.
 1998: Festival of Baalbek, Lebanon, participation in the evening of the Band "Sarband. "
 1997: Medina Festival, Tunis, Solo Oud Performance.
 1995: Al Bustan Festival, Lebanon, Solo Oud Performance.
 1995: Beit Ed-dine Festival, Lebanon, participation in the "controversial" by Marcel Khalife.

Charbel composed music for the choreographer Abdul Halim Caracalla’s shows: "2000 and 2 Nights" [2002], “Bi Laylat Qamar” [1999], “Andalusia, the Lost Glory” [1997], and “Elissa, Queen of Carthage” [1995]

References

1965 births
Living people
Lebanese oud players
People from Amsheet
Lebanese musicians
Lebanese Maronites